Access All Areas is a live album by the Eric Burdon and Brian Auger Band recorded at the Belly Up Tavern, Solana Beach, California on 10 May 1993.

History
When they first met in 1991, Auger asked Burdon if he wanted to play with him. Burdon agreed and they formed the "Eric Burdon – Brian Auger Band". After several tours they disbanded in 1994. Drummer Karma Auger is Auger's son.

Track listing
Disc one 
 "Introduction" – (0:11)
 "Don't Bring Me Down" (Gerry Goffin, Carole King) – (4:09)
 "Misunderstood Intro" – (1:55)
 "Don't Let Me Be Misunderstood" (Bennie Benjamin, Sol Marcus) – (7:22)
 "Monterey" (Barry Jenkins, Eric Burdon, Ian McCulloch, John Weider, Vic Briggs) – (6:34)
 "We Gotta Get out of This Place" (Barry Mann, Cynthia Weil) – (13:11)
 "I Just Wanna Make Love To You" (Willie Dixon) – (11:28)
 "Roadhouse Blues" (Jim Morrison) – (8:35)
 "When I Was Young" (Burdon, Weider, Briggs) – (5:18)
 "It's My Life" (Carl D'Errico, Roger Atkins) – (3:50)
 "Spill the Wine" (War – (10:38)

Disc two
 "River Deep Mountain High" (Ellie Greenwich, Jeff Barry, Phil Spector) – (7:02)
 "Bring It On Home To Me" (Sam Cooke) – (8:31)
 "No More Elmore James" (Burdon) – (12:00)
 "Band Intro For Eric" – (1:23)
 "Tobacco Road" (John D. Loudermilk) – (11:57)
 "Sky Pilot" (Jenkins, Burdon, Weider, Briggs) – (9:24)
 "Rising Sun Guitar Intro" (Larry Wilkins) – (2:20)
 "House of the Rising Sun" (Traditional; arranged by Burdon and Auger) – (8:49)
 "Sixteen Tons" (Merle Travis) – (3:36)

Personnel
 Eric Burdon – vocals
 Brian Auger – keyboards
 Dave Meros – bass, vocals
 Larry Wilkins – guitar, vocals
 Karma Auger – drums
 Richard Regueira – percussion

Eric Burdon albums
1993 live albums